This is a list of settlements in Dorset by population based on the results of the 2011 census. The next United Kingdom census will take place in 2021. In 2011, there were 18 built-up area subdivisions with 5,000 or more inhabitants in Dorset, shown in the table below, along with the slightly smaller Lyme Regis.

This not a list of parishes or their populations, but of settlements as defined by the ONS.

Population ranking

See also 

 Dorset

References

External links 
 ONS Census website

Dorset
Dorset-related lists
Dorset